Nizhniy Anzyr is a village in the Nakhchivan Autonomous Republic of Azerbaijan.

No Azerbaijani website mentions it under this name.

References
 

Populated places in Azerbaijan
Populated places in Nakhchivan Autonomous Republic